Serpent's Wall ( is an ancient system of  earthworks (valla) located in the middle Dnieper Ukraine (Naddniprianshchyna) that stretch across primarily Kyiv Oblast, Ukraine. They seem to be similar in purpose and character to Trajan's Wall situated to the southwest in Bessarabia. The remaining ancient walls have a total length of 1,000 km and constitute less than 20% of the original wall system.

History
According to legend, the earthworks are the result of ancient events when a mythical hero (bohatyr), Kozmodemian (or Borysohlib), in order to slay a gargantuan Dragon (Serpent), harnessed it in a giant plow and furrowed. The Dragon (Serpent) bit the dust and left furrows, on both sides of which were immense banks of earth that became known as Serpent's Wall.

The ancient walls were built between the 2nd century BC and 7th century AD, according to carbon dating. There are three theories as to what peoples built the walls: either the Sarmatians against the Scythians, or the Goths of Oium against the Huns, or the Early East Slavs against the nomads of the southern steppes. In Slavic culture, the warlike nomads are often associated with the winged dragon, hence the name.

On the right bank of Dnieper between its tributaries Teteriv and Ros the remnants of the wall create six lines elongated from west to east. One Serpent's Wall passed over the left bank of Dnieper and its tributary Sula.

The 1974-85 explorations established that Serpent's Wall is a remnant of wooded earth fortifications built at the end of 10th and the first half of 11th centuries, smaller part in the 12th century, to protect middle Dnieper Ukraine and Kyiv from Pechenegs and Cumans.

Gallery

References

External links 
 Photo documentary about the Serpent's Wall, by Elena Filatova

Landmarks in Ukraine
Fortifications in Ukraine
Walls
Ruins in Ukraine
Fortification lines
History of Kyiv Oblast
Linear earthworks